Dam Chenar-e Hadiabad (also Romanized as Dam Chenār-e Hādīābād; also known as Dam Chenār-e Pā’īn and Dam Chenār Pā‘īn) is a village in Chenar Rural District, Kabgian District, Dana County, Kohgiluyeh and Boyer-Ahmad Province, Iran. At the 2006 census, its population was 301, in 61 families.

References 

Populated places in Dana County